The first cabinet of Petru Groza was the government of Romania from 6 March 1945 to 30 November 1946. It was Romania's first Communist-led government. World War II ended during this government.

Ministers
The ministers of the cabinet were as follows:

President of the Council of Ministers:
Petru Groza (6 March 1945 - 30 November 1946)
Vice President of the Council of Ministers and Minister of Foreign Affairs:
Gheorghe Tătărăscu (6 March 1945 - 30 November 1946)
Minister of the Interior:
Teohari Georgescu (6 March 1945 - 30 November 1946)
Minister of Justice:
Lucrețiu Pătrășcanu (6 March 1945 - 30 November 1946)
Minister of War:
Gen. Constantin Vasiliu-Rășcanu (6 March 1945 - 30 November 1946)
Minister of Finance:
Dumitru Alimănișteanu (6 March - 11 April 1945)
Mircea Duma (11 April - 23 August 1945)
Alexandru Alexandrini (23 August 1945 - 30 November 1946)
Minister of Agriculture and Property:
Romulus Zăroni (6 March 1945 - 30 November 1946)
Minister of Industry and Commerce:
Petre Bejan (6 March 1945 - 30 November 1946)
Minister of Mines and Petroleum:
Tudor Ionescu (6 March 1945 - 30 November 1946)
Minister of Communications and Public Works:
Gheorghe Gheorghiu-Dej (6 March 1945 - 30 November 1946)
Minister of Cooperation:
Anton Alexandrescu (6 March 1945 - 30 November 1946)
Minister of Labour:
Lothar Rădăceanu (6 March 1945 - 30 November 1946)
Minister of Social Assistance and Insurance:
Gheorghe Nicolau (6 March 1945 - 30 November 1946)
Minister of Health:
Dumitru Bagdasar (6 March 1945 - 24 April 1946)
(interim) Petre Constantinescu-Iași (24 April - 30 November 1946)
Minister of National Education:
Ștefan Voitec (6 March 1945 - 30 November 1946)
Minister of Propaganda:
Petre Constantinescu-Iași (6 March 1945 - 30 November 1946)
Minister of Religious Affairs:
Constantin Burducea (6 March 1945 - 30 November 1946)
Minister of the Arts:
Mihail Ralea (6 March 1945 - 19 August 1946)
Octav Livezeanu (19 August - 30 November 1946)

Minister Secretaries of State:
Emil Hațieganu (7 January - 30 November 1946)
Mihail Romniceanu (7 January - 30 November 1946)

References

Cabinets of Romania
Cabinets established in 1945
Cabinets disestablished in 1946
1945 establishments in Romania
1946 disestablishments in Romania
Romania in World War II